I Don't Run is the second studio album by Spanish garage rock band Hinds. It was released on April 6, 2018 under Mom + Pop Music and is their first studio album since 2016's Leave Me Alone. The band worked on the album with Gordon Raphael, who produced albums for American band The Strokes and singer Regina Spektor. The album was preceded by the singles and music videos for "New For You", "The Club" and "Finally Floating". On October 1, 2018, Hinds released an alternative acoustic version of "Rookie" through Amazon Music, inspired by a relaxed version of "Revolution" by The Beatles.

Music and lyrics
I Don't Run features jangling guitar and the interplay of dual vocalists Ana Perrote and Carlotta Cosials, with critics making musical comparisons to The Strokes, The Velvet Underground, The Breeders, Beach House, and The Libertines. The album includes both upbeat and relaxed songs, employing vocal harmonies, chants, guitar riffs, and fuzzed vocals.

Lyrically, the album deals with more mature themes than Leave Me Alone, including the unglamorous realities of awkward romantic situations, infidelity, long-distance romance, and the loneliness of touring. The album includes lyrics in both English and Spanish.

Reception 

I Don't Run received uniformly positive reviews upon its release. Critics praised Hinds's ability to remain playful and authentic even while maturing their lyrics and diversifying their sound. Several critics noted an increase in sophistication of song structure and precision compared to their first album, with Stuart Berman of Pitchfork praising its "superior songcraft." Rolling Stone's Will Hermes called the album a "gem of indie-rock revivalism," and described the album's musical qualities as "bouncy pluck, boozy melodicism and hard-sparkling guitars." For Flood Magazine, Lydia Pudzianowski wrote that Hinds has "learned a lot since their breakout, resulting in a more confident sound that amplifies what made people love the band in the first place."

With respect to the album's lyrics, The Independent'''s Ilana Kaplan wrote that they are intended to be taken seriously, even as the band "thrives on its imperfections." Pitchfork's Berman wrote that the "audible sense of camaraderie" between the two vocalists, Ana Perrote and Carlotta Cosials, is the strongest characteristic of the album. Discussing a weak point of the album in an otherwise positive review, Jordan Bassett of NME wrote that the album does not push musical boundaries, but rather mostly draws on sounds from past decades.

In June 2018, Rolling Stone included I Don't Run'' on its list of "50 Best Albums of 2018 So Far", with Will Hermes praising its "off-handed magnificence" and comparing the drum beats to those of The Velvet Underground's Moe Tucker.

Track listing
All tracks were written by Hinds (Carlotta Cosials, Amber Grimbergen, Ade Martín, and Ana Perrote).  All tracks were produced by Hinds and Gordon Raphael, except "New for You", which was produced by Hinds.

Personnel

Hinds
 Carlotta Cosials – vocals, guitar
 Amber Grimbergen – drums
 Ade Martín – bass guitar
 Ana García Perrote – vocals, guitar

Additional personnel
 Shawn Everett – mixing
 Paco Loco – engineering
 Gordon Raphael – production
 Neelam Khan Vela – photography

Charts

References

2018 albums
Mom + Pop Music albums
Hinds (band) albums
Albums produced by Gordon Raphael